The Funk Heritage Center in Waleska, Georgia, is Georgia's official frontier and southeastern Indian interpretive center.  Located on the campus of Reinhardt University, the center houses a gallery of Native American artifacts and artwork, as well as a theater, which features a short film on the history
of Native Americans in the southeastern United States. A small souvenir shop is also available.

A 2003 statute named the center as Georgia's official Frontier and Southeastern Indian Interpretive Center.

See also 

 Sequoyah
 New Echota
 Etowah Indian Mounds

References

External links 
 Funk Heritage Center official website
 Explore Georgia tourism webpage

Archaeological museums in Georgia (U.S. state)
Cherokee culture
Native American history of Georgia (U.S. state)
Native American museums in Georgia (U.S. state)
Trail of Tears
Tourist attractions in Cherokee County, Georgia
Reinhardt University
Waleska, Georgia
Museums established in 1999
1999 establishments in Georgia (U.S. state)
Symbols of Georgia (U.S. state)